Mont, Belgium may refer to:

Mont, Bastogne, a village in the Luxembourg municipality of Bastogne
Mont, Houffalize, a village in the Luxembourg municipality of Houffalize
Mont, Malmedy, a hamlet in the Liège municipality of Malmedy
Mont, Theux, a village in the Liège municipality of Theux
Mont, Yvoir, a village in the Namur municipality of Yvoir
Mont (Picard), Picard name of the Hainaut city of Mons

See also 
 Mont (disambiguation)